Set partitioning in hierarchical trees (SPIHT) is an image compression algorithm that exploits the inherent similarities across the subbands in a wavelet decomposition of an image. The algorithm was developed by Brazilian engineer Amir Said with William A. Pearlman in 1996.

General description 
The algorithm codes the most important wavelet transform coefficients first, and transmits the bits so that an increasingly refined copy of the original image can be obtained progressively.

See also
 EZW
 Wavelet

References

External links 

Image compression
Wavelets
Brazilian inventions